Matteo William Campagna (born June 27, 2004) is a Canadian professional soccer player who currently plays for Vancouver Whitecaps FC.

Early life
Campagna began playing soccer at age five with Surrey United SC. He was also part of the BC Soccer Provincial Program. In 2017, he joined the Vancouver Whitecaps FC Academy.

Club career
In April 2021, Campagna signed a Homegrown player contract with Vancouver Whitecaps FC. On August 24, 2021, Campagna was loaned to Canadian Premier League side York United for the remainder of the season. He made his professional debut four days later on August 28, against Forge FC. In 2022, he was loaned to the second team, Whitecaps FC 2 in MLS Next Pro.

International career
In 2019, Campagna made his debut in the Canadian youth program attending a camp with the Canada U15 team. He was then subsequently named to the roster for the 2019 CONCACAF Boys' Under-15 Championship, where he played in all five of the team's matches, making four starts. In April 2022, Campagna was called up to the Canadian U20 side for two friendlies against Costa Rica. In June 2022, he was named to the rostr for the 2022 CONCACAF U-20 Championship.

Personal life
Campagna was born in Canada to an Italian father and Canadian mother. He is the younger brother of professional soccer player Cristian Campagna.

References

External links
 
 

2004 births
Living people
Canadian soccer players
Canada men's youth international soccer players
Canadian sportspeople of Italian descent
Association football defenders
Vancouver Whitecaps FC players
York United FC players
Soccer players from Vancouver
Homegrown Players (MLS)
Canadian Premier League players
Whitecaps FC 2 players
MLS Next Pro players